Pioneer Pacific College is a private for-profit college with its main campus in Beaverton, Oregon. Founded in 1981, it primarily offers Associate degrees and certificate programs.

History

Pioneer Pacific College began in 1981 as an electronics school in Corvallis, Oregon, named Skilltronics. Founded by Irene and James Childers, the training school was moved to Wilsonville in 1983. Pacific Education Corporation purchased Skilltronics in 1989 and changed the name to Pioneer Pacific College with accreditation coming in 1995. Former Oregon legislator Kelly Clark co-owned the college in the early 1990s.

In 1999, the college added a campus in Clackamas and the next year moved the main campus to a larger facility. For the 2001 to 2002 academic year the school granted 108 associate degrees. Pioneer Pacific started a criminal justice program in 2002 that offered an associate degree at its Wilsonville campus. Also in 2002, the school established a campus in Lane County adjacent to the University of Oregon, with the campus relocating the next year to Springfield.

Bachelor's degrees were added in 2004, first with information technology and then others in 2005. In 2004, the college added the Health Career Institute, followed by a culinary arts program in 2006. For the 2005 to 2006 academic year the school's criminal justice program ranked 41st in the United States for most associate degrees granted in that field. As of 2007, the school had 1,287 students with 250 graduating each year. In 2012 Pioneer Pacific College was granted approval by the American Bar Associationton to offer the Bachelor of Science Degree in Legal Studies. 2014, In 2014 Springfield campus was granted preliminary approval by the Joint Review Committee on Education in Radiologic Technology (JRCert) to offer its Associate of Science Degree in Radiologic Technology program. In 2015, Beaverton learning site was opened and granted approval to begin classes from ACICS.

The college announced plans to close its campuses in Portland, Beaverton, and Springfield as well as the Oregon Culinary Institute at the end of July 2020. The college already had plans to fire 131 faculty and staff members due to lowered enrollment it attributed to the COVID-19 pandemic.

Campuses

Pioneer Pacific College has three campus locations in the Portland Metro and surrounding areas including Beaverton, and Springfield, in addition to a facility for culinary arts in downtown Portland. Pioneer Pacific's main campus is in Beaverton.The Beaverton, OR campus offers courses in legal studies and healthcare. The campus location was opened in August 2015 and granted approval by the ACICS. The culinary arts program is taught at the Oregon Culinary Institute in Downtown Portland. The culinary school offers programs in Culinary Management Associate of Applied Science Degree, Culinary Arts, Baking and Pastry Management Associate of Applied Science Degree (AAS), and Baking and Pastry Diploma. Seventy-three percent of students attend full-time and the school employs 119 teachers, of which 41% are full-time faculty members.

Academics 
Pioneer Pacific College currently offers several degree and diploma programs in the healthcare, business, and legal fields. Online/Hybrid Courses are also available through an online platform. The school has been accredited by the Accrediting Council for Independent Colleges and Schools since 1995.

References

External links
Official website

For-profit universities and colleges in the United States
Educational institutions established in 1981
Private universities and colleges in Oregon
Education in Clackamas County, Oregon
Buildings and structures in Wilsonville, Oregon
1981 establishments in Oregon